Avi Wisnia is a Philadelphia-based singer-songwriter who blends bossa nova with 1950's West Coast Jazz, blues, acoustic folk and contemporary pop. Since his first performance in New York City's Caffe Vivaldi in 2005, Avi has actively recorded and performed in the United States. In 2007, he recorded his first EP, Avi Wisnia Presents. In 2009, he won the OutMusic Award for Outstanding Jazz Song of the year, for his cover of TLC's "No Scrubs". This track also appears on his 2010 full-length debut "Something New," which received praise from several New York City and Philadelphia press outlets, including Time Out New York, The L Magazine, 88.5 WXPN in Philadelphia. His September 2015 release, the digital single Sky Blue Sky was recorded via satellite between Rio de Janeiro and Philadelphia. This song was also a finalist in both the Philadelphia Songwriter's Project Songwriting Competition and in the Vocal Jazz/Blues category of the 32nd Mid-Atlantic Song Contest. Music Historian blogger Patricia Trutescu reviewed "Sky Blue Sky" and wrote that "the verses in 'Sky Blue Sky' tell a story of the musician’s vivid memories of playing music on the Brazilian Ipanema beach, hiking along the Italian Amalfi Coast, sailing in the San Francisco Bay, lounging on the rooftops of Philadelphia, and more."

Avi is the grandson of Polish-born Cantor and Holocaust survivor, the late David S. Wisnia, who periodically performed live with Avi.

Discography 

All songs are written by Avi Wisnia, except where noted

Albums

Singles

References

Living people
American singer-songwriters
1982 births
21st-century American singers